This list showcases the Primetime Emmy Award winners in the comedy program, drama program, variety program, and lead actors categories.

In the early days of the Primetime Emmy Awards, categories awarded by the Academy of Television Arts & Sciences changed year-to-year, causing irregularities in the continuity of the listed awards.

For several years, in the late 1950s and early 1960s, the Academy did not differentiate between comedy and dramas in the individual performance categories, issuing only a catch-all "Best Continuing Performance" or "Outstanding (Actor/Actress) in a Series".

During the mid-1950s, the Academy split Outstanding Drama into several categories, including "One Hour or More", "Half Hour or Less", and "Western or Adventure Series". Each winner is indicated below.

In 1965, Academy President Rod Serling initiated "Area Awards" that narrowed the categories to a select few and allowed for multiple winners in an attempt to foster less competition in favor of more programs and individuals receiving credit for their work. The experiment lasted for only one awards season.

 
 
Primetime Emmy Awards